Russian Fascist Organization (RFO) was the name adopted by a Russian émigré group active in Manchuria before World War II.

The RFO was formed in 1925 by members of the Law Faculty at Harbin Normal University. Under the leadership of Prof. N.I. Nikiforov, it looked to Italian fascism for inspiration and produced the 'Theses of Russian Fascism' in 1927. The RFO smuggled some propaganda into the Soviet Union, although this was brought to the attention of China who banned the group from publishing such works. In 1931 the RFO absorbed into the newly founded Russian Fascist Party (RFP) under the leadership of Konstantin Rodzaevsky.

References

Works cited
E. Oberländer, 'The All-Russian Fascist Party', Journal of Contemporary History, Vol. 1, No. 1. (1966), pp. 158–173

External links
 The Russian Fascists: Tragedy and Farce in Exile, 1925–1945 by John J. Stephan 
 К. В. Родзаевский. Завещание Русского фашиста. М., ФЭРИ-В, 2001 
 А.В. Окороков. Фашизм и русская эмиграция (1920–1945 гг.). М., Руссаки, 2002 

Russian nationalist organizations
Politics of the Soviet Union
Manchuria
Russian Fascist Party
Political parties established in 1925
1925 establishments in China
Anti-communist parties
Defunct nationalist parties in Russia
Defunct far-right parties
Far-right political parties in Russia
1931 disestablishments in China
Political parties disestablished in 1931